"Rise & Fall" is a song by British singer Craig David. It was written for his second studio album, Slicker Than Your Average (2002), while production was helmed by duo Soulshock and Karlin. The song, a collaboration with fellow British musician Sting, is based on a sample of the song "Shape of My Heart" from Sting's 1993 album Ten Summoner's Tales. "Rise & Fall" served as the album's the third single and returned David to the UK top five, peaking at number two on the UK Singles Chart. It also returned David to the top ten on the Australian Singles Chart. In Hungary, Poland, and Romania, "Rise & Fall" topped the singles charts. The song was also included in Sting's Duets compilation album (2021).

Chart performance
"Rise & Fall" charted at number two on the UK Singles Chart, spending ten weeks inside the top 75. It also charted at number six on the Australian Singles Chart.

Music video
The music video was directed by Max & Dania, who have directed a number of Craig David's videos.

Track listings

Notes
  signifies an additional producer

Credits and personnel

Dick Beetham  – mastering engineer
Craig David – vocals, writer
Manny Marroquin – mixing engineer

Dominic Miller – writer
Soulshock and Karlin – arranger, mixing, producer
Sting – vocals, writer

Charts

Weekly charts

Year-end charts

Release history

See also
 List of Romanian Top 100 number ones of the 2000s

References

2002 songs
2003 singles
Atlantic Records singles
Contemporary R&B ballads
Craig David songs
Music videos directed by Max & Dania
Number-one singles in Hungary
Number-one singles in Poland
Number-one singles in Romania
Song recordings produced by Soulshock and Karlin
Songs written by Craig David
Songs written by Sting (musician)
Male vocal duets